This article shows the rosters of all participating teams at the men's indoor volleyball tournament at the 2004 Summer Olympics in Athens.

Pool A

The following is the Argentine roster in the men's volleyball tournament of the 2004 Summer Olympics.

Head coach: Alberto Armoa

The following is the French roster in the men's volleyball tournament of the 2004 Summer Olympics.

Head coach: Philippe Blain

The following is the Greek roster in the men's volleyball tournament of the 2004 Summer Olympics.

Head coach: Stelios Prosalikas

The following is the Polish roster in the men's volleyball tournament of the 2004 Summer Olympics.

Head coach: Stanisław Gościniak

The following is the Serbia and Montenegrin roster in the men's volleyball tournament of the 2004 Summer Olympics.

Head coach: Ljubomir Travica

The following is the Tunisian roster in the men's volleyball tournament of the 2004 Summer Olympics.

Head coach: Antonio Giacobbe

Pool B

The following is the Australian roster in the men's volleyball tournament of the 2004 Summer Olympics.

Head coach: Jon Uriarte

The following is the Brazilian roster in the men's volleyball tournament of the 2004 Summer Olympics.

Head coach: Bernardo Rezende

The following is the Italian roster in the men's volleyball tournament of the 2004 Summer Olympics.

Head coach: Gian Paolo Montali

The following is the Dutch roster in the men's volleyball tournament of the 2004 Summer Olympics.

Head coach: Bert Goedkoop

The following is the Russian roster in the men's volleyball tournament of the 2004 Summer Olympics.

Head coach: Gennady Shipulin

The following is the American roster in the men's volleyball tournament of the 2004 Summer Olympics.

Head coach: Doug Beal

References

External links
Official website

2004
2
Volleyball at the 2004 Summer Olympics
Men's events at the 2004 Summer Olympics